Elsa van Dien (12 July 1914 – 15 October 2007) was an astronomer.  She received her Ph.D. from Harvard University.  She married Gale Bruno van Albada who was also an astronomer.

Biography
Elsa van Dien was born in Paramaribo (Surinam) on 12 July 1914. She was the daughter of Rebecca da Silva and Gerrit van Dien. The family moved to the Netherlands in 1923. Elsa began studying astronomy at the University of Amsterdam in 1932. She also registered at the University of Leiden (The Netherlands) in 1935, to have access to its observatory. 

After her studies, she started to teach at the Gemeentelijk Lyceum in Zaandam. On 21 November 1940, she was fired for being Jewish. When the deportations started, she went into hiding at reverend J.C.S. Locher in Leiden, and managed to survive the war.

She was awarded a scholarship by Radcliffe College for September 1939, but due to the Second World War she could only commence her PhD there in September 1945, also with support of the American Association of University Women (AAUW). Her thesis, supervised by Donald Menzel, discussed the Stark effect in the Balmer lines of  early type stars.

After her PhD, she initially stayed at the Dominion Astrophysical Observatory in Victoria, Canada. In 1948 she moved back to the Netherlands. In August 1948 she was appointed at the Bosscha Observatory near Bandung, Indonesia. There she met and married Gale Bruno van Albada. She continued her astronomical research until 1958, when the family returned to the Netherlands. She edited the Dutch journal Wetenschap en Samenleving from 1965 to 1972. In the 1970s and 1980, after the death of Van Albada in 1972, she once again resumed her astronomical research.

References

Sources
 Scientific commons entry
 Personal notes by Elsa van Dien (2000 - 2005)

1914 births
2007 deaths
20th-century Dutch astronomers
Dutch women scientists
People from Paramaribo
Surinamese Jews
Dutch Jews
Radcliffe College alumni
University of Amsterdam alumni
Women astronomers
Leiden University alumni
Dutch expatriates in the United States
Surinamese emigrants to the Netherlands